Hays is a census-designated place (CDP) in Wilkes County, North Carolina, United States. The population was 1,731 at the 2000 census. North Wilkes High School, one of Wilkes County's four public high schools, is located in Hays.

Geography
Hays is located at  (36.2499, -81.1156).

Demographics

As of the census of 2000, there were 1,731 people, 686 households, and 526 families residing in the CDP. The population density was 283.1 people per square mile (109.4/km2). There were 729 housing units at an average density of 119.2 per square mile (46.1/km2). The racial makeup of the CDP was 98.21% White, 0.52% African American, 0.23% Asian, 0.75% from other races, and 0.29% from two or more races. Hispanic or Latino of any race were 1.04% of the population.

There were 686 households, out of which 34.3% had children under the age of 18 living with them, 62.8% were married couples living together, 9.3% had a female householder with no husband present, and 23.2% were non-families. 20.3% of all households were made up of individuals, and 8.0% had someone living alone who was 65 years of age or older. The average household size was 2.51 and the average family size was 2.88.

In the CDP, the population was spread out, with 23.2% under the age of 18, 8.1% from 18 to 24, 32.8% from 25 to 44, 24.6% from 45 to 64, and 11.4% who were 65 years of age or older. The median age was 37 years. For every 100 females, there were 96.5 males. For every 100 females age 18 and over, there were 96.5 males.

The median income for a household in the CDP was $37,642, and the median income for a family was $40,144. Males had a median income of $27,601 versus $21,520 for females. The per capita income for the CDP was $16,869. About 12.6% of families and 17.6% of the population were below the poverty line, including 29.2% of those under age 18 and 11.5% of those age 65 or over.

References

External links
 Hays, North Carolina is at coordinates .

Census-designated places in North Carolina
Census-designated places in Wilkes County, North Carolina